The Mark of Kri is an action-adventure game developed by San Diego Studio and published by Sony Computer Entertainment exclusively for PlayStation 2. The game was followed by Rise of the Kasai, which was released in April 2005.

Background 
With an art team consisting mostly of former 2D animators, The Mark of Kri offered a juxtaposition of cartoonish character designs and graphic violence while employing a unique visual style influenced by various Polynesian cultures and art, as well as the game's plot taking place in a Polynesian-influenced fantasy setting, and Maori mythology.

The game also featured elements of adaptive music, with techniques developed specifically for the game, and "incredibly tight synchronization [with] on-screen state changes."

Plot 
The story begins with Rau Utu, a great and noble warrior in a new generation of warrior protectors of the bearers of the Marks of Kri called the Rakus, trained by his mentor, adopted father, and the last of the older generation of the Rakus, Baumusu.

Accompanied during his adventure by a raven, Kuzo, his scout, spirit guide, chronicler and narrator of the story, he was taught stealth and extraordinary skill with his sword. He was also taught to be a hero to help those in need rather than act as a mercenary. Rau was being asked for a favor by the village innkeeper, Rongo, as well as an old cleric, Maoruku, from the north of Tapuroku, who says that bandits are keeping business away and asks Rau to look into it. After Rau takes care of the bandits, news of his prowess as a warrior and his heroics spread far and wide.

This leads to a mysterious man showing up in the tavern, who offers Rau money for his services. Despite the uneasy feeling that Rau has about the man and Baumusu's suspicions regarding the necromancer, he accepts his offer. He then travels to the forest of Heiadoko, where he retrieves a piece of parchment from the tomb of Sambu-usu. This parchment, however, is actually one of the Marks of Kri - human skin. Rau returns home from his job to find that he's been taken advantage of by the mysterious man known simply as the "Dark One".

The man later revealed turns out to be the Ganguun Priest, a member of an evil organization, the Kasai, and is devoted to its efforts to rule the world, as well as subverting Rau's true destiny. Furthermore, Rau then is told by an elderly woman, the fortune teller named Simka, that the money Rau received from him was a counterfeit, a curse marked by the Kasai. He then is told to head north to a place called Vaitaku, to find a tree and eat its fruit, knowing that this special tree is an oracle.

After Rau eats the sacred fruit, the oracle tree informs him both of the Mark of Kri, and his destiny to protect a captured boy. The boy, the oracle says, holds the fifth mark, which the "Dark One" will soon have in his twisted possession. Furthermore, it is revealed that Rau not only has a great destiny, but will be among the gods, as his name will be used and whispered to quiet the children on stormy nights, and songs will be sung and written in his name. Finally, Rau is told that the sixth and final mark is well protected.

He then travels to the heavily guarded temple of Meifiti, to save a boy from being sacrificed. However, when Rau reaches the boy, he is already sacrificed by the Dark One, directly leading him to a trap, designed by the Dark One himself. Upon returning to the Inn, Rau discovers that his village has been attacked and destroyed as part of his devious trap. When he discovered the carnage the Kasai had wrought, Baumusu, tells him of his path in life, and that Rau must find his sister, Tati, who has the final Mark of Kri, had been taken during the attack on the village, before dying as a great noble warrior and as a Rakus.

As Rau's soul and heart demanded vengeance for Baumusu's death and his village's destruction at the hands of the Kasai, he travels to Rahtutusai, and encounters the Dark One. After Rau defeats his horde of Zombies and the Kasai troops, the Dark One asks him to join him on his quest for world domination. Rau declines by throwing an axe at the Dark One's head, killing him, avenging the deaths of Baumusu, the innkeeper, the destruction of his village, and succeeds in rescuing Tati at the end.

However, there was more work to be done between them, according to Kuzo, that Rau and Tati, now vowed to confront an old enemy long forgotten, and save the Three Kingdoms from world domination at the hands of the Kasai. "But all of this is a different story, for another time." Kuzo said before flying away.

Gameplay 
The game makes use of the DualShock 2's analog sticks. The left is used for movement and the right for locking on to surrounding enemies.

Reception

The Mark of Kri received favorable reviews according to the review aggregation website Metacritic. The game was given a score of 8.5 out of 10 and awarded Game of the Month in the August 2002 issue of Electronic Gaming Monthly. In Japan, where the game was ported and published by Capcom on October 23, 2003, Famitsu gave it a score of 32 out of 40.

Entertainment Weekly gave the game an A and called it "the most surprising, and visionary, action-adventure game of the summer." Maxim gave it a score of 8 out of 10 and stated that "As an engrossing adventure, Kri doesn’t cut very deep, but where quick, visceral payoffs are concerned, it goes straight for the jugular." However, The Cincinnati Enquirer gave it a score of three-and-a-half stars out of five and said the game was "a little on the short side (about 10 hours to complete or so) but does prove to be a fun fantasy romp for those who prefer action, stealth and attractive visuals."

The game was a runner-up for the "Outstanding Character or Story Development" and "Outstanding Animation" awards at the Academy of Interactive Arts & Sciences' 6th Annual Interactive Achievement Awards, both of which went to Eternal Darkness: Sanity's Requiem and Sly Cooper and the Thievius Raccoonus. It was also a runner-up for the "Outstanding Animation in a Game Engine", "Outstanding Art Direction in a Game Engine", and "Outstanding Costume Design" awards by the National Academy of Video Game Trade Reviewers, all of which went to Sly Cooper and the Thievius Raccoonus, Metroid Prime, and Kingdom Hearts.

The Mark of Kri aroused some controversy in New Zealand, where some regarded Sony as having made culturally insensitive use of elements of Māori culture in the design of the game.

References

External links

2002 video games
Action-adventure games
PlayStation 2 games
PlayStation 2-only games
Sony Interactive Entertainment games
Video games scored by Jack Wall
Video games developed in the United States
San Diego Studio games
Single-player video games